George F. Brasno (December 23, 1911 – August 15, 1982) was an American actor who appeared in a few films through the 1930s and 1940s. He and his sister Olive Brasno were first recognized as a brother and sister little-people singing team in a partnership with Buster Shaver's vaudeville act. He was also billed as George Shaver.

Career
Brasno was the son of Mr. and Mrs. George Brasno, born in the community of Old Bridge, New Jersey, and later resided in South River. Brasno and his sister Olive Brasno started out as a brother and sister dwarf act performing with the Johnny Jones Exposition. Buster Shaver saw them, and they joined his vaudeville act. In 1937, George and Olive Brasno were offered roles in the film The Wizard of Oz (1939) but they declined because they were making more money on the road with their singing act.

For several years, the pair was joined by brother Richard to form an entertainment trio.

Despite turning down the opportunity, they starred in a few movies and shorts between public appearances such as: The Great John L. (1945), Little Miss Broadway (1938), Arbor Day (1936), Charlie Chan at the Circus (1936), Carnival (1935), The Mighty Barnum (1934), Shrimps for a Day (1934), and Sitting Pretty (1933).

Billed as George Shaver, Brasno appeared on Broadway as part of the family trio in Are You With It? (1945).

Death
George Brasno died in South River, New Jersey on August 15, 1982. He was 70 years old.

Filmography

Film

References

External links
 
 

1911 births
1982 deaths
American male film actors
Actors with dwarfism
20th-century American male actors
People from East Brunswick, New Jersey
People from South River, New Jersey